Joseph Urban (May 26, 1872 – July 10, 1933) was an Austrian-American architect, illustrator, and scenic designer.

Life and career

Joseph Urban was born on May 26, 1872, in Vienna. He received his first architectural commission at age 19 when he was selected to design the new wing of the Abdin Palace in Cairo by Tewfik Pasha. He became known around the world for his innovative use of color, his pointillist technique, and his decorative use of line. He designed buildings throughout the world from Esterhazy Castle in Hungary to the Ziegfeld Theatre in New York.

Urban studied architecture at the Academy of Fine Arts Vienna under Karl von Hasenauer. In 1890, he and his brother-in-law, Heinrich Lefler, were among the founders of the Hagenbund. Urban's early work with illustrated books was inspired by Lefler and, together, they created what are considered seminal examples of children's book illustration.

Urban immigrated to the United States in 1911 to become the art director of the Boston Opera Company. He was already an accomplished international architect, illustrator and theatre set designer with over 50 productions from his home Vienna Royal Opera, the Champs Elysée Opera, and Covent Garden. By applying points of primary colors side by side on the canvas backdrops he was able to create and light theatre sets of vivid color reminiscent of the works by Monet or Seurat. In 1914 he moved to New York City, where he designed productions for the Metropolitan Opera and the Ziegfeld Follies; he continued to design for Florenz Ziegfeld Jr. until 1931. William Randolph Hearst was an important client and supporter. He also co-produced with Richard Ordynski Percy MacKaye's "Community Masque" Caliban by the Yellow Sands.

Beginning in 1917, he was frequently engaged as stage designer by the Metropolitan Opera of New York City. In all he created set designs for 47 new productions at the house through 1933. His many designs provided the opera company with a cohesive production style throughout the tenure of General Manager Giulio Gatti-Casazza. Many of Urban's settings remained in the company's repertoire into the 1950s.

Soon his sets and innovative lighting caught the eye of Florenz Ziegfeld Jr., who hired him to design the Follies in the 1920s. Urban went to work creating a stunning night-club with glass balconies, a moving stage, and rainbow lighting effects. This Danse de Follies soon became a blend of ideas and talent before serving in the Follies theatre. Urban had success after success in his creating of the Follies' sets, and William Randolph Hearst, a media tycoon, took notice and wanted to hire Urban to work on his films starring Marion Davies, his mistress, and previous Follies starlet. Hearst came to an understanding with his friend Ziegfeld that Urban's work for him would not interfere with any of the Follies productions. Urban worked on 25 films over the years.

Urban died July 10, 1933, of a heart attack at his apartment at the St. Regis Hotel in Manhattan, where he had been convalescing following surgery in May.

Legacy
Urban was one of the originators of the American Art Deco style. Most of his architectural work in the United States has been demolished. Extant buildings include the Mar-a-Lago, The Bath and Tennis Club and The Paramount Theater all in Palm Beach, Florida; The New School building in New York City; and the base of the Hearst Tower in New York City. The stage lighting gel Roscolux Urban Blue #81, still used today, is named for him.

Work

Architecture and interior design

This partial list omits unrealized projects.
 1900: Wohn- und Bürohaus Wien 8, Buchfeldgasse 6 (with Hermann Stierlin)
 1902: Villa Goltz, Wien 19, Grinzinger Straße 87 
 1903: Villa Wiener, Wien 13, Veitingergasse 21
 1904: Exhibition space, Austrian Pavilion, Louisiana Purchase Exposition, St. Louis, Missouri
 1907: Villa Redlich, Wien 19, Kreindlgasse 11
 1907: Wohnhaus, Wien 19, Krottenbachstraße 11
 1907: Villa Max Landau, Semmering, Südbahnstraße 83
 1910: Villa Dr. Mair, Scheiblingkirchen, Kreuzackergasse 43
 1920: Sherman Hotel Panther Room, Chicago
 1922: Wiener Werkstätte showroom, New York City
 1925: C.C. Lightbown House, 4839 Colorado Avenue, NW, Washington, DC, Permit #7278, March 10, 1925, cost $25,000.
 1926: Mar-a-Lago, Palm Beach, Florida
 1926: Demarest Little Castle, Palm Beach, Florida
 1926: Paramount Theatre, Palm Beach, Florida
 1927: Anthony Biddle residence, Palm Beach, Florida
 1927: Bath and Tennis Club, Palm Beach, Florida
 1927: Ziegfeld Theatre, New York City
 1926–27: St. Regis Hotel Roof Garden
 1928: Hotel Gibson Roof Garden, Cincinnati, Ohio
 1928: Bossert Hotel, Grill Room, Brooklyn
 1928: Bedell Store, New York City
 1928–29: William Penn Hotel, Urban Room, Pittsburgh, Pennsylvania
 1929: International Magazine Building, New York City
 1929: Central Park Casino
 1929: Metropolitan Museum of Art 11th annual exhibition of American Industrial Art
 1929: The Gingerbread Castle, Hamburg, New Jersey
 1930: The New School for Social Research, New York City
 1929–31: Atlantic Beach Club, Long Island, New York
 1931: Park Avenue Restaurant, 128 E 58th Street
 1932: Congress Hotel, Joseph Urban Room, Chicago, Illinois
 1929: Urban Room, Omni William Penn Hotel, Pittsburgh, Pennsylvania
 1933: Katherine Brush Apartment
 1933: Color scheme for the Century of Progress International Exposition

Book illustrations
 1905: Grimm's Märchen
 1907: Kling-Klang Gloria
 1911: Andersen Kalender
 1914: Marienkind

References

Further reading 
 Curl, Donald W. "Joseph Urban's Palm Beach Architecture". Florida Historical Quarterly 71(April 1993): 436–457.
 Berkovich, Gary. Reclaiming a History. Jewish Architects in Imperial Russia and the USSR. Volume 2. Soviet Avant-garde: 1917–1933. Weimar und Rostock: Grunberg Verlag. 2021. P. 155.

External links

Finding aid to the Joseph Urban papers at the Rare Book and Manuscript Library, Columbia University
Joseph Urban's Stage Design Models and Documents Project Columbia University
Cinema Treasures on Urban
Hearst Tower Photographs
New School for Social Research

Antiquity Echoes History, photos, and video of the Gingerbread Castle in Hamburg, New Jersey.

1872 births
1933 deaths
American scenic designers
Austrian scenic designers
Opera designers
Artists from Vienna
Architecture firms based in New York City
Architects from New York City
American people of Austrian descent
Burials at Sleepy Hollow Cemetery